Marvel Super-Heroes is the name of several comic book series and specials published by Marvel Comics.

Publication history

One-shot
The first was the one-shot Marvel Super Heroes Special #1 (Oct. 1966) produced as a tie-in to The Marvel Super Heroes animated television program,<ref>{{cite book|last = DeFalco|first = Tom|author-link = Tom DeFalco|last2= Gilbert|first2= Laura, ed.|chapter= 1960s|title = Marvel Chronicle A Year by Year History|publisher= Dorling Kindersley|year = 2008|location= London, United Kingdom|page = 119|isbn =978-0756641238|quote=  To help support the new animated television show, Martin Goodman told Stan Lee to produce a comic called Marvel Super Heroes.}}</ref> reprinting Daredevil #1 (April 1964) and The Avengers #2 (Nov. 1963), plus two stories from the 1930s-1940s period fans and historians call Golden Age of comic books: "The Human Torch and the Sub-Mariner Meet" (Marvel Mystery Comics #8, June 1940), and the first Marvel story by future editor-in-chief Stan Lee, the two-page text piece "Captain America Foils the Traitor's Revenge" (Captain America Comics #3, May 1941).

This summer special was a 25¢ "giant", relative to the typical 12¢ comics of the times.

First series

The first ongoing series of this name began as Fantasy Masterpieces, initially a standard-sized, 12¢ anthology reprinting "pre-superhero Marvel" monster and sci-fi/fantasy stories. With issue #3 (June 1966), the title was expanded to a 25-cent giant reprinting a mix of those stories and Golden Age superhero stories from Marvel's 1940s iteration as Timely Comics. Fantasy Masterpieces ran 11 issues (Feb. 1966–Oct. 1967) before being renamed Marvel Super-Heroes with #12 (Dec. 1967).

While continuing with the same mix of reprint material, this first volume of Marvel Super-Heroes also began showcasing a try-out feature as each issue's lead. This encompassed solo stories of such supporting characters as Medusa of the Inhumans, as well as the debuts of Captain Marvel (#12), the Phantom Eagle (#16) and the Guardians of the Galaxy (#18).  The Spider-Man story drawn by Ross Andru in issue #14 was originally planned as a fill-in issue of The Amazing Spider-Man but was used here when that title's regular artist John Romita Sr. recovered more quickly than anticipated from a wrist injury. Andru would become the regular artist on The Amazing Spider-Man several years later.

Under either name, this series' Golden Age reprints represented the newly emerging comic-book fandom's first exposure to some of the earliest work of such important creators as Jack Kirby, Bill Everett, and Carl Burgos, and to such long-unseen and unfamiliar characters as the Whizzer and the Destroyer. Fantasy Masterpieces #10 (Aug. 1967) reprinted the entirety of the full-length All-Winners Squad story from the (unhyphenated) All Winners Comics #19 (Fall 1946). Fantasy Masterpieces  #11 (Oct. 1967) re-introduced the work of the late artist Joe Maneely, a star of 1950s comics who had died in a train accident.

Original featuresMarvel Super-Heroes became an all-reprint magazine beginning with #21 (July 1969) (except for an original "Tales of the Watcher" story in #23), and a regular-sized comic at the then-standard 20-cent price with #32 (Sept. 1972). This reprint series lasted through issue #105 (Jan. 1982).

A second series titled Fantasy Masterpieces ran from #1-14 (Dec. 1979–Jan. 1981), reprinting truncated versions of the 1968 Silver Surfer series, and Adam Warlock stories from Strange Tales and Warlock.

 Second Series 
The 15-issue Marvel Super-Heroes (vol. 2) (May 1990–Oct. 1993) was published quarterly and generally printed "inventory stories," those assigned to serve as emergency filler. The first issue featured a Brother Voodoo story drawn by Fred Hembeck in a dramatic style rather than his usual "cartoony" art.

 Stories in Marvel Super-Heroes Vol 2 

Other iterations
In September 1979, the Marvel UK series The Mighty World of Marvel was retitled Marvel Superheroes after a brief run under the title Marvel Comic.

The name itself reappeared, without a hyphen, as part of the title of a 12-issue, company-wide crossover miniseries Marvel Super Heroes Secret Wars (May 1984–April 1985). The 1985-1986 sequel was titled simply Secret Wars II.

The final series of this title was the six-issue Marvel Super-Heroes Megazine'' (Oct. 1994–March 1995), a 100-page book reprinting 1970s and 1980s Fantastic Four, Daredevil, Iron Man and Hulk stories in each issue.

References

External links 
 Marvel Super-Heroes at the Unofficial Handbook of Marvel Comics Creators

1967 comics debuts
1982 comics endings
1990 comics debuts
1993 comics endings
Comics anthologies
Comics by Archie Goodwin (comics)
Comics by Roy Thomas
Comics by Stan Lee
Defunct American comics
Marvel Comics one-shots
Marvel Comics titles